Bernhard, schavuit van Oranje (English title: Bernhard, scoundrel of Orange) is a Dutch television program depicting the more than only turbulent life of a prince consort. It is a compelling drama concerning a man who tries to be himself, but must survive deep crises, finally to see the real meaning of love. Within the Dutch royal family there is actually no more talked about character than Prince Bernhard of Lippe-Biesterfeld. Whether it concerns Greet Hofmans, extramarital affairs, or Lockheed, Prince Bernhard faced a lot of scandals throughout the course of his life. Besides this he was, and is a person, loved by many as a war hero. A man of extremes. In four parts Prince Bernhard tells the tale of his life. Not only through the spyglass, but especially to his grandson's wife, Princess Máxima of the Netherlands, who will be soon the Queen next to Prince Willem-Alexander. In a way, she takes the same position as Prince Bernhard did in his life. In their conversations and discussions it becomes clear how much they are different, but also how much they are the same. For Princess Máxima this is sometimes very confronting. The tale drags us throughout the course of the Prince's life, from Soestdijk, his beloved German Reckenwalde, Berlin, London, Argentina and Canada.

Cast

Dutch drama television series
Television series based on actual events
2010s Dutch television series
2010 Dutch television series debuts
2010 Dutch television series endings
NPO 1 original programming